Najwa Najjar is a film writer and director. She was born to a Jordanian father and Palestinian mother. She began her career making commercials and has worked in both documentary and fiction since 1999. 

Short Bio
Writer/Director Najwa Najjar has explored several new artistic grounds having written, directed and produced over a dozen critically acclaimed award winning films premiering in Cairo, Berlin, Cannes, Locarno and Sundance. 

In 2020 she was invited to join the Academy of Motion Picture Arts and Sciences and the European Film Academy EFA. She was recently honoured for her work at the 2021 Awsan International Women’s Film Festival and at the Tiro Arts Festival in Lebanon 2021.

With a MA Film(US) she has worked in both documentary and fiction since 2000. Her critically acclaimed debut was the feature film Pomegranates and Myrrh (2009). Her second award winning film Eyes of a Thief (2014) was the Palestinian nomination for the 2015 Oscars Best Foreign Film. Her third feature film Between Heaven and Earth Nov 2019 won the 41st Cairo IFF Naguib Mahfouz Best Screenplay award (now reaping more awards), and was selected to the European Film Academy Awards 2020. Najjar is presently in development of her 4th feature film Kiss of a Stranger, a musical.

Longer Bio
Writer/ Director Najwa Najjar was recently invited to join The Academy of Arts and Sciences (2020) She received her BA in Political Science and Economics, MA in Film (US) and has worked in both documentary and fiction since 2000. Her critically acclaimed debut was the feature film Pomegranates and Myrrh (2009). Her second award winning feature film Eyes of a Thief (2014) was the Palestinian nomination for the 2015 Oscars Best Foreign Film and the Golden Globe Awards.

Her third feature film, a road trip: Between Heaven and Earth completed Nov 2019 played at the Cairo International Film Festival international competition, and won the Naguib Mahfouz Best Screenplay award followed by several more awards as festivals resumed in August 2020, and was selected to the European Film Academy, The Golden Globes, Asia Pacific Screen Awards and nominated to the Icelandic TV&Film Academy Awards.

Previous work include several award-winning films also shown worldwide (Berlin, Cannes, Locarno, Hamptons,) : Yasmine Tughani (2006) , Naim and Wadee’a (2000), Quintessence of Oblivion(2001), Blue Gold (2004), A Boy Called Mohamad (2002), and They Came from the East which opened the 2004 European Academy Awards. Najjar produced a collection of short films by international filmmakers Gaza Winter (2009).

A speaker on numerous panels on cinema and a Jury member of several International Film. Festivals, she has given Director’s Masterclasses. Najjar has reviewed books, and her articles on Palestinian cinema have been published. She has been a reader for the Rawi Sundance Lab for Arab scriptwriters and has been an advisor for the Rawi Sundance Scriptwriter’s Lab.

RELATED PROFESSIONAL EXPERIENCE

2022 Masterclass writing for the screen Al Ula

Workshop from Script to Screen Riyadh

Film Screening and Discussion with HE Laila Chahid Cannes Film Festival 

2021 Elected to the European Film Academy

Jury member Malmo Arab Film Festival 2021

Jury member Tiro Short Film Festival Tyre, Lebanon 2021

Jury President Aswan International Women’s Film Festival Honoured at the Aswan International Women’s Film Festival 2021

2021 Honoured at Tiro Arts Festival, Lebanon

Jury Mostra di Cinema Valencia 2021

Retrospective Najwa Najjar Films Palestine En Vue, France Mentor two Saudi Writers from Idea to Script

2020 Member of the International Jury Cairo International Film Festival 42nd Women Empowerment Panel El Gouna Film Festival
Elected as a Member of The Academy of Arts and Sciences (Writers)

Jury Member Kısa Film Yarışması, Istanbul

Masterclass Jesuit College Cairo Film and Difficult Circumstances Masterclass Royal Film Commission Jordan Being a Woman in the Industry

Masterclass Istanbuli Theatre Tyre, Lebanon

2019 Masterclass Direction Luxembourg Film Festival Arab Cinema Panel RFC/Cannes Film Festival

Jury Member Uluslararası Dostluk Kısa Film Festivali Istanbul 2018 Guest Filmmaker Film Independent Series“Film Arabi” 

2017 Jury Member Antalya Int’l Film festival

Jury Member El Gouna Film Festival

2016 Director’s Masterclass Galway Film Festival

Panalist MAFF Development Panel Cannes Film Festival Panalist 4th

Annual Women on the Front Lines conference Beirut, Lebanon 2015 Advisor RAWI Sundance Scriptwriter’s Lab

2013/14 Advisor RAWI Sundance Scriptwriter’s Lab

2012 Jury Mawred Development Film Fund

2011 Panalist Euromed Audiovisual III Programme Regional Cinema Needs

Panalist Royal Film Commission post Scriptwriter Lab experience 2010 Panal Palestinian Cinema Festival on Wheels Adana, Turkey

Jury Cairo International Film Festival

Jury One Minute films.Doha Film Festival with Robert DeNiro and Mira Nair and Master of Ceremony for Awards Closing Night Doha Film Festival with Robert DeNiro

2009 Jury Locarno International Film Festival

Panalist Palestinian Cinema under Conflict Mons Festival D’Amour

2008 Reader for RAWI Sundance Lab in Jordan

2007 Organizer Held seminar for Palestinian Filmmakers by UK producer
Robin Gutch from “Idea, to Script to Screen.”

2006 56th Berlinale Talent Campus panelist: Filming in Difficult Locations 2006 One of founders for Palestinian Collective

2005 Sundance Scriptwriter’s Lab Amman Jordan

2004 World Bank/Silverdocs Film Festival panelist: Small
Format, Big Stories

2004 Mark Travis Masterclasses Directing/ Intimacy/Conflict 2002/3 MEDEA training (3) in scriptwriting/financing/marketing for
Feature Films – each training course 6 days

2002 Speaker at Berkley University, San Francisco – Women Filmmakers in
the Arab World (4 female filmmakers were chosen from the Arab
World to present and screen their work)

2001 Course: Directing Actors at the National School for Film and TV, UK 2000 United Nations Development Programme TOKTEN to research and
film for a documentary on the water conditions in the occupied
Palestinian territories.

2000 Exhibition at the Witte de With Museum in Rotterdam
(part of the From/To Exhibition by Farid Armaly) Presented Pomegranates and Myrrh presently in script form, into three 1.5m x .

EDUCATION
MA Film

BA Political Science/Economics
(USA)

LANGUAGES
Fluent Arabic and English, proficient in French

FILM’S TRAILERS

https://www.youtube.com/watch?v=3pgNh9kTUaM Trailer Eyes of a Thief (2014)
and
https://www.youtube.com/watch?v=NgofDQxSGRQ Trailer Pomegranates and Myrrh (2009)
https://www.youtube.com/watch?v=ku9y-Y9xUZs TRAILER BETWEEN HEAVEN AND EARTH

Her debut feature film Pomegranates and Myrrh won 10 awards, and was released theatrically and screened at over 80 international festivals. When the film was first screened in Ramallah, there was public outcry by the Hamas Government in Gaza over the film's portrayal of "what was deemed its 'unpatriotic' portrayal of an untrustworthy wife of a political prisoner." At the Doha Tribeca Film Festival, the film won the Best Arab Film award.

The 1999 documentary film Naim and Wadee’a was based on Najjar's family and includes the oral histories of Na’im Azar and Wadee’a Aghabi, a couple who were forced to leave their Jaffa home in 1948. The film won the Award for Films of Conflict and Resolution at the 2000 Hamptons International Film Festival.

Her film, Eyes of a Thief, was the official Palestinian submission to the 87th Academy Awards.

Najjar lives in the Palestinian Territories.

Filmography

Naim and Wadee’a (1999)
Quintessence of Oblivion (2000)
A Boy Named Mohamed (2001)
Blue Gold (2004)
They Came from the East (2004)
Yasmine Tughani (2006)
Pomegranates and Myrrh (2009)
Eyes of a Thief (2014)
Between Heaven and Earth (2019)
 "Lifting the Mask" 2020
 "Kiss of a Stranger" 2022 in development

2020 Kiss of a Stranger (Writer/Director)
A musical about a belly dancer and gambler sworn off of love, who find themselvesntogether in cosmopolitan Alexandria at the brink of WWII

2020 Lifting the Mask (Writer/Director)
Short film In the Time of Corona "asks renown Palestinian filmmakers to let us into their worlds, their thoughts and perhaps also their anger or fears."

2019 Between Heaven and Earth (Writer/Director)
A love story about divorce. Sometimes the most unexpected roads in life are in the
 detours you didn’t mean to take. A road movie in Palestine.
OFFICIAL COMPETITION Cairo International Film Festival NAGUIB MAHFOUZ AWARD for Best Screenplay
Selected European Film Academy Awards 2021
Selected Golden Globes Awards 2021
Selected Asia Pacific Screen Awards 2022
Nominated Icelandic Film&TV Academy Awards
Best Feature Audience Award Boston Palestine Film Festival
Audience Award Middle East Now Film Festival Florence
Best Male Performance Mostra di Valencia FilmFestival
Honorable Mention Olhares do Mediterraneo Women’s Film Festival Lisbon
Best Feature Film Audience Award Arab Film Fest Collab (4 major festivals in the US)
Scriptwriting Awards
Film Independent Fast Track/LA
MIA Coproduction Rome IFF
Special Jury award Cairo Film Connection

2014 EYES OF A THIEF Writer/Director
Inspired by a true story a Palestinian sniper returns to his town after 10 years to find the daughter he left behind with Egyptian Superstar Khaled Abu Naga and French Algerian diva Souad Massi.
Palestine Nomination for Best Foreign Film Oscars 2015 and Golden Globes 2015 **Winner Best Director Kolkotta Int’l Film Festival 2014
Winner Best Actor Cairo Int’l Film Festival 2014
Certificate of Appreciation Malak Ermileh Malmo IFF 2015
Audience Award Best Feature Film Boston FF 2015
Sundance Scriptwriting Lab 2011
Sundance Duke Grant Recipient Jan 2011
Winner Dubai Film Connection Dec 2011
Winner Jordan Film Fund Dec 2011
Participant Rome International Film Festival New Cinema Network
HANI KORT Winner Best Producer with invite to the Producer’s Network Cannes Film Festival 2013

2009 GAZA WINTER Producer
Gaza’s Winter is a collection of 12 short films made by filmmakers from around the world immediately after the bombardment of Gaza which left some 1,417 Palestinians dead, over 10,000 homes destroyed and thousands severely and permanently injured. The collection comprises work by the following directors: Islam al Burbar (Gaza), Tareq Elayyan (Gaza), Dima Hamdan (UK), Fahad Jabali (Iceland), Pilar Tavora (Spain), Salim Abu Jabal (Golan Heights), George Azar (Palestine/Jordan), Ismail Habbash (Ramallah), Mathieu Cauville (France), Khmais Hmaid (Tunis), Raed al Helou (Ramallah), and Omar Hamilton (UK).

2009 POMEGRANATES AND MYRRH Writer/Director
Independent fictional film (95 min) on a Palestinian female search for freedom after her husband is imprisoned. (Arabic/English/Hebrew with subtitles) shot super 16mm. Screened in over 70 int’l festivals
Script Winner Screenplay Development Fund Amiens
Cinema in Motion San Sebastian Film Festival (4 awards)
Winner Best Arab Film Audience Award DohaTribeca FF
Winner Amal Arab European Film Festival Spain Grand Prix
Winner Best Actress and Best Cinematographer Muscat International Film Festival
 Youssef Chahine grand prix de cinema at Festival International de Cinéma d'Auteur de Rabat
Special Mention for best actress Festival International de Cinéma d'Auteur de Rabat
2006 YASMINE’S SONG Writer/Director
20 minute short fictional tale on two lovers trying to crossing divides ...they thought nothing could stop them (Super 16mm Arabic with subtitles) competition Clermont-
Ferrand Short Film Festival 2006
official selection 56th Berlinale
Cannes Short Film Corner
Locarno International Film Festival
(over 50 international film festivals)
winner: Grand Prix FICA/Portugal
Herodotus Peace Award Bodrum International Film Festival Special Mention Locarno International Film Festival
Best Musical Score SoleLuna film Festival Palermo Italy Journalist Award Short Film Festival Morocco

2004 THEY CAME FROM THE EAST
A take on the three Wise Men of the Biblical past in Palestine today. Three minute piece opened the European Film Academy awards in Barcelona 2004

2004 BLUE GOLD
24 minute documentary on the water situation in the country with particular emphasis on the Hebron area. Commission by European Commission (Arabic/English/Hebrew with subtitles)

2002 A BOY CALLED ... MOHAMMED Writer/Director
10 minute documentary on a 12 year old boy, Mohammed, who works carrying goods for Palestinians across the Qalandia Checkpoint manned by Israeli soldiers. (Arabic with English subtitles) Winner: Films for Peace and Justice

2001 JAWHAR AL SILWAN (QUINTESSENCE OF OBLIVION) Writer/Director/Producer/ Camera
45 minute documentary on Cinema Al Hambra still standing at the end of Salahaldin Street in Arab East Jerusalem. Behind it’s now sealed doors lie the stories of the city’s history. Arabic (English subtitles) Beta SP Winner: ART Desert Rain Film Festival, Italy (6/2001)

2000 NAIM & WADEE’A Writer/Director/Producer
20 minute documentary on the social history of Yaffa, Palestine based on the oral history of the filmmaker’s family, and includes photo archives of the Azar family (a Yaffan family) Arabic (English and French subtitles) Beta SP
Winner: Films of Conflict and Resolution at the Hamptons International Film Festival 2000
Movimiento de Documentalistas, Argentina (9/2002)

References

General references

External links

Interview with Najjar at the 2009 Edinburgh International Film Festival
Women vs Occupation in Pomegranates and Myrrh

Palestinian film producers
Living people
Year of birth missing (living people)